Around the Horn (ATH) is an American sports roundtable discussion show, conducted in the style of a panel game, produced by ESPN. The show premiered on November 4, 2002, as a replacement for Unscripted with Chris Connelly, and has aired daily at 5:00 p.m. ET on ESPN ever since. The show has been recorded in New York City since September 8, 2014, and has had over 4,000 episodes aired as of 2020. The program emanated from Washington, D.C., where it was located in the same facility as Pardon the Interruption (PTI). Production still is based in Washington, D.C. The moderator for the show is Tony Reali, who has hosted the program since 2004, replacing Max Kellerman, and also served as the statistician on Pardon the Interruption until the show's relocation to New York.

Broadcast history

Around the Horn premiered on November 4, 2002. From its premiere until January 30, 2004, the show was hosted by Max Kellerman, who at the time was largely known strictly as a contributor to ESPN's Friday Night Fights. In late 2003, Kellerman announced that he would depart from the network for Fox Sports; after the show tried out several replacements, current host Tony Reali was named the permanent host on February 2, 2004, three days after Kellerman's last episode aired. As of September 23, 2019, Woody Paige has the most wins in the history of the show, with more than six hundred. Despite early negative reviews due to its now-defunct argumentative formatting, the show has lasted more than seventeen years on the air, remaining a staple on ESPN. The show became less combative and more playful over the years, and in 2018, changed its look with augmented reality of the panel with Reali standing in an enhanced studio at ESPN's South Street Seaport studios with a continuation of the relaxed tone of the show since the mid-2010s.

The show went on hiatus from March 16, 2020, to May 8, 2020, as a result of a national emergency being declared due to the COVID-19 pandemic, which caused the suspension of sports leagues around the world. Between May 11, 2020, and July 10, 2020, Around the Horn aired for 20 minutes with commercials at 4:40 p.m. EDT as Around the Home under a new format where Tony Reali, along with three panelists, discussed sports issues from their own homes. The Around the Home format became semi-permanent beginning with the July 13, 2020 episode, which saw the show expand back to its normal length. The show returned to its regular format when it returned to the studio in September 2020, although the Around the Home format is still used occasionally.

The set
The original set was in the same Atlantic Video complex as the set for Pardon the Interruption. It featured the host's desk with the point triggers and mute buttons. The judge of the show scores four panelists, that are shown on four different screens. Behind the host's desk was a map of the contiguous United States of America with the cities the sportswriters on the show appeared from. The map, divided into time zones, displayed the names of five newspapers representing each time zone. The Los Angeles Times represented the Pacific Time Zone, the Denver Post the Mountain Time Zone, the Dallas Morning News and Chicago Sun-Times both represented the Central Time Zone, and the Boston Globe represented the Eastern Time Zone. This was to create a regionally biased discussion, but this was later phased out.

When panelist Woody Paige was based in New York, the logo of Cold Pizza was added to the Eastern Time Zone side of the map as Paige also appeared on that program. Eventually, the logo of the Boston Globe was replaced by the word "Boston" as many of the contributors from Boston were no longer writing for the Globe. The map was eventually revised in this way for the other cities on the map, but there cities of other contributors were not added to the board (possibly due to a lack of space) before the map was removed. Panelists still appear from left to right as on a map of the United States, from the westernmost on the left to the easternmost on the right.

On September 27, 2010, Around the Horn and Pardon the Interruption began broadcasting in high definition and moved from the Atlantic Video complex to facilities in the ABC News Washington bureau, where high definition sets were built for both shows. In 2014, Reali relocated to New York, with a studio built in ABC's Times Square Studios. In 2018, in conjunction with the conclusion of Reali's work on Good Morning America, the show moved to ESPN's South Street Seaport Studios with an enhanced set featuring augmented reality.

Each panelist appears either in the offices of their newspaper, in front of a screen representing the city in which they are located, or in another studio. Dallas, Denver, and Los Angeles (when Bill Plaschke is appearing) still use their newspaper offices as studio space while Washington, Miami, Chicago, and Boston each have their own screens. (Los Angeles employs this as well when J.A. Adande is a panelist.) Newspaper office space is rarely used in today's iteration.

Rounds
The current Around the Horn format consists of the following:
Introduction: Three sports headlines that will be discussed during the show are previewed; this is followed by the show's open.
The First Word: Current sports headlines are discussed. The panelists give detailed arguments and can also give rebuttals to other panelists. This round lasts until the first commercial break.
Buy or Sell: A rapid-fire segment in which the panelists are asked to "buy" or "sell" (be for or against) three different concepts, also drawn from current sports headlines. In the first few months of this format and sometimes used with three panelists, four topics were discussed, with each having a shorter time limit to fit between the first and second commercial breaks. In the case of a scoring change happening during the first commercial break, Reali will tell the scores and announce the panelist or panelists that committed the "commercial break violation" before the first "Buy or Sell" topic. Between 2010 and March 2020, the 2 lowest scoring panelists were eliminated after this round; with the format change adopted in July 2020, the lowest-scoring panelist was eliminated.
Showdown: Mentioned above, the two remaining columnists take sides on any sports or cultural stories remaining. There are two or three questions, depending on the amount of time left. Usually, the westernmost panelist goes first for the first topic, with the other speaking for the second half. The panelists then alternate going first for the remaining topics. Each topic is timed between 15 and 40 seconds each depending on time remaining. Reali usually gives a panelist one point per topic, although he occasionally gives more than one point or deducts points depending on the strength or weakness of the argument. Only once there was a one-person showdown and a four people showdown.
Face Time: The winner of the showdown and therefore winner of that particular episode gets around 30 seconds (more or less depending on time left in show frame) to talk about any issue. Most of the time these are sports related, but often their own personal life or an issue in pop culture or the news is discussed. Formerly, Lounge music is played in the background as the winner talks. The lounge music is not played in serious Face Time (deaths, major news (both sports and non-sports related)). Since 2018, the theme song plays throughout Face Time.
Goodbye: Reali says how long it will be until the next episode, for example, "we're on a 23-and-a-half hour break." On Fridays, he will sign off by saying "a 71-and-a-half-hour break." If there is an extended period until the show comes back on, Reali may simply say, "You do the math!"
Paper Toss: Signature sign-off of the show, with Reali crumpling his notes and throwing them towards the camera. As he does this, the panelists will often continue to chatter in the background as the show ends. Since the summer of 2016, Reali has gone more towards throwing paper airplanes or flicking paper footballs toward the camera.
PTI Next: This simply tells viewers just that: that Pardon the Interruption is up next.

Previous formats
Before the format of the show was changed in early 2003, the format was similar, wherein the first two rounds were largely the same but with different titles. There was a bigger difference after that. The show ran like so:
The Opening Round: The two biggest headlines of the day.
The Lightning Round: A quick-moving round with four topics where players had to make their points quickly or risk getting muted by Max Kellerman, the former host. Somewhat similar, though not entirely, to the Lightning Round used from 2009 to 2015.
The Bonus Round: One final topic, with the panelists trying to earn some last-second points, followed by a sports trivia question for each panelist, worth five points.
The Medal Round: The panelists earned Face Time equal to their scores converted to seconds, in reverse order of their placing. The winner wins a gold medal, the runner up received silver, third place got bronze, and the last-place finisher was given a foil ball. More often than not, due to time restrictions, the panelists were given less time than they earned, or at least one panelist would not be given any time at all. During this round, panelists could appeal to the Disembodied Voice for more points.

Despite the change in format, Reali still occasionally announces "ten topics, one winner" at the beginning of the show regardless of the number of topics.

This format ran from 2003 thru 2015:
Introduction: A commercial-free transition to the opening moments of the show starts with the host, Reali, introducing the panelists as "four of America's most (themed) sportswriters." For example, if the "theme word" is "indifferent", the four panelists would all do their impressions of an indifferent sportswriter. The show itself is then introduced with Reali mentioning three topics to be discussed, then exclaiming "Ten topics, one winner. Horn me!" The opening theme plays, and cuts to Reali for an introduction. The panelists are then individually introduced and given time for an opening statement. Most of the panelists use this time for jokes or criticism of the host or other panelists, which can lead to points or mutes. (One such example is when Woody Paige used his time by blowing a miniature plasticine horn, as a pun towards the show's name; this resulted in Paige being muted by Reali). Also any scoring changes that can be seen on ATH's YouTube page, Reali will tell the scores and announce the panelist or panelists that committed the "Pre-Show violation" before the first "First Word" topic.
The First Word: Two current sports headlines are discussed. The panelists give detailed arguments and can also give rebuttals to other panelists.
Buy or Sell: A rapid-fire segment in which the panelists are asked to "buy" or "sell" (be for or against) three different concepts, also drawn from current sports headlines. In the first few months of this format and sometimes used with three panelists, four topics were discussed, with each having a shorter time limit to fit between the first and second commercial breaks. In the case of a scoring change happening during the first commercial break, Reali will tell the scores and announce the panelist or panelists that committed the "commercial break violation" before the first "Buy or Sell" topic.
1st Cut: The contestant with the lowest point total is eliminated. In the case of ties, Reali often breaks them by miscellaneous things, like whose hair is better combed. If the awarding of a point causes a tie for the two lowest panelists, Reali sometimes gives the same panelist a second point to break it. Sometimes on shows with three panelists, the lowest score is spared from elimination.
Out of Bounds: This round, always played as the third round, is dedicated to talking about one story which is indirectly sports-related. Serious and controversial topics, such as steroid use and suspensions, are usually discussed in this round, and few to no points are awarded. This was a daily feature from the time of the format change until late October 2009. It is occasionally tied together with the "Lightning Round." "Out of Bounds" is now used in ATH today.
The Lightning Round: Another third round, this being a continuation of the sports discussion with two or three rapid-fire topics. Reintroduced to the show in November 2009, a different "Lightning Round" was part of the original ATH format.
2nd Cut: The next contestant with the lowest point total is removed, leaving just two. (In the event all four contestants were in the third round (mostly an important Out of Bounds), the two lowest point totals are eliminated). The camera then reveals the final two contestants and Reali typically says something to the effect of, "Two men enter, one man wins!" right before the cut to commercial.
Showdown: Mentioned above, the two remaining columnists take sides on any sports or cultural stories remaining. There are two or three questions, depending on the amount of time left. Usually, the westernmost panelist goes first for the first topic, with the other speaking for the second half. The panelists then alternate going first for the remaining topics. Each topic is timed between 15 and 40 seconds each depending on time remaining. Reali usually gives a panelist one point per topic, although he occasionally gives more than one point or deducts points depending on the strength or weakness of the argument. Only once there was a one-person showdown and a four people showdown.
Face Time: The winner of the showdown and therefore winner of that particular episode gets around 30 seconds (more or less depending on time left in show frame) to talk about anything he or she wishes to discuss. Most of the time these are sports related, but often their own personal life or an issue in pop culture or the news is discussed. Lounge music is played in the background as the winner talks. The lounge music is not played in serious Face Time (deaths, major news (both sports and non-sports related)).
Goodbye: Reali says how long it will be until the next episode, for example, "we're on a 23-and-a-half hour break." On Fridays, he will sign off by saying "a 71-and-a-half-hour break." If there is an extended period until the show comes back on, Reali may simply say, "You do the math!"
Paper Toss: Signature sign-off of the show, with Reali crumpling his notes and throwing them towards the camera. As he does this, the panelists will often continue to chatter in the background as the show ends. Since the summer of 2016, Reali has gone more towards throwing paper airplanes or flicking paper footballs toward the camera.
PTI Next: This simply tells viewers just that: that Pardon the Interruption is up next.

Hosts
 Max Kellerman (November 4, 2002 - January 30, 2004)
 Tony Reali (February 2, 2004 – present)

Guest hosts
 Zachariah Selwyn (June 8, 2004 - June 11, 2004)
 Duke Castiglione (July 3, 2006 - July 5, 2006)
 Rob Stone (June 30, 2008 - July 4, 2008 and July 28, 2008 - August 1, 2008)
 Woody Paige (April 1, 2009 and April 1, 2019, both as April Fools' Day pranks)
 Pablo S. Torre (Recurring guest host from March 12, 2014, to July 14, 2017)
 Michael Smith (August 25, 2016 - August 26, 2016 and July 9, 2018 - July 26, 2018)
 Kate Fagan (August 21, 2017 - August 25, 2017, June 11, 2018 - June 15, 2018, and August 27, 2018 - August 30, 2018)
 Kevin Blackistone (June 5, 2018 - June 8, 2018)
 Clinton Yates (August 31, 2018, August 12, 2019, August 30, 2019, October 18, 2021 - October 22, 2021 and March 15, 2022 - March 16, 2022)
 Sarah Spain (August 13, 2019 - August 14, 2019, August 26, 2019 - August 29, 2019, August 28, 2020, June 24, 2021 - June 25, 2021, October 28, 2021, and March 21, 2022 - March 25, 2022)
 Frank Isola (June 18, 2021, October 25, 2021 - October 27, 2021, January 31, 2022, February 1, 2022, and March 14, 2022)

Panelists

Active panelists
As of 11/4/2022
 J. A. Adande: Former columnist for the Los Angeles Times and NBA reporter for ESPN. Left ESPN in August 2017 to focus full-time on his position as director of sports journalism at Northwestern University but returned in January 2018. Based in Los Angeles at ESPN's base there and Chicago while school is in session.
 Kevin Blackistone:The Washington Post, former columnist for The Dallas Morning News. Based in Washington, D.C., was formerly based in Dallas at the headquarters of the Morning News.
 Tim Cowlishaw: The Dallas Morning News, former reporter for ESPN's NASCAR coverage. Based in Dallas at the headquarters of the Morning News.
 Courtney Cronin: Chicago Bears reporter for ESPN. Based in Chicago.
 David Dennis Jr.: Senior writer for ESPN.com's Andscape. Based in Atlanta.
 Elle Duncan: SportsCenter 6 PM co-anchor. Based in Bristol, CT.
 Israel Gutierrez: co-host of Highly Questionable, based in Miami at ESPN's studios at the Clevelander Hotel.
 Frank Isola: columnist for The Athletic. Based in New York.
 Bomani Jones: former co-host of High Noon alongside Pablo S. Torre, co-host of Highly Questionable, host of The Right Time with Bomani Jones, writer for ESPN.com. Based in New York; formerly based in Raleigh, North Carolina and later Miami.
 Emily Kaplan: Writer, Reporter, Podcaster. Lead NHL reporter and insider for ESPN/ABC and In The Crease with Linda Cohn. Previously NFL w/ MMQB, Philly Inquirer. Based in Chicago.
 Mina Kimes: Senior writer for ESPN The Magazine and co-host of Highly Questionable. Based at network's base in Los Angeles.
 Joon Lee: Staff writer for ESPN.com who contributes to ESPN's MLB telecasts; former writer for Bleacher Report and Boston Herald. Based in New York.
 Monica McNutt: ACCN college basketball analyst. Based in Washington, D.C.
 Woody Paige: Colorado Springs Gazette. Based in Denver at KMGH-TV. Was based in New York during his time on 1st and 10. Although he left The Denver Post in 2016, he continued to be based there while in Denver until February 2017.
 Bill Plaschke: Los Angeles Times. Based in Los Angeles at the headquarters for the Times.
 Bob Ryan: columnist emeritus, substitute host of PTI. Based in Boston.
 Jorge Sedano: Radio host for ESPN Radio stations, NBA on ESPN sideline reporter. Based in Miami.
 Sarah Spain: Columnist for espnW, co-host of ESPN Radio's Spain and Fitz, occasional contributor to Highly Questionable. Based in Chicago.
 Ramona Shelburne: Senior writer for espn.com. Co-host of TMI with Beadle & Shelburne on ESPNLA 710. Based in Los Angeles at network's base.
 Justin Tinsley: Senior writer for ESPN.com's Andscape. Based in Washington, D.C.
 Pablo S. Torre: Co-host of High Noon alongside Bomani Jones, writer for ESPN The Magazine and ESPN.com, former reporter for Sports Illustrated, and occasional co-host of The Dan Le Batard Show. Also the designated substitute host. Usually based in New York, but sometimes based in Miami.
 Clinton Yates: Senior writer for ESPN.com's The Undefeated. Based in Los Angeles.

Former panelists
 Jim Armstrong: former columnist for The Denver Post, based in Denver. Was a frequent fill-in for Woody Paige.
 Josh Elliott: former panelist of defunct show "Jim Rome is Burning," former contributor to ESPN the Magazine and ESPN.com, anchor of live morning SportsCenter with Hannah Storm. Left ESPN to become news anchor for Good Morning America, later moving to NBC Sports and most recently to CBS News. Was based in New York.
 Kate Fagan: Columnist for espnW, contributor to Outside The Lines. Based in New York.
 Domonique Foxworth: Former American football cornerback who played in the National Football League. Now a writer with The Undefeated. He is also a regular guest on The Mike O'Meara Show and other ESPN Radio talk shows such as First Take and Highly Questionable. Based in Washington, D.C.
 Jemele Hill: columnist for ESPN.com's The Undefeated; former co-host of SportsCenter at 6 and His & Hers, both alongside Michael Smith. Currently based in Washington, D.C.
 Michael Holley: former columnist for The Boston Globe, works with CSN New England and WEEI-FM radio talk show "The Big Show", based in Boston. Originally a semi-regular, Holley left the show and ESPN to contribute to I, Max on Fox Sports Net.
 Richard Justice: former correspondent for MLB.com and former columnist for the Houston Chronicle. Was based in Houston.
 Andy Katz: former ESPN college basketball analyst.
 Jackie MacMullan: ESPN.com NBA columnist and freelance writer; former columnist for The Boston Globe, based in Boston.
 Jay Mariotti: Fanhouse.com, former columnist for the Chicago Sun-Times. Was arrested on May 11, 2011, and was charged with assault, stalking and domestic violence after approaching his ex-girlfriend, who he was ordered by a court to avoid, and was based in Los Angeles at the time of his arrest. Had been based at the headquarters of the Sun-Times. Mariotti appeared 1549 times on the show, with 329 wins.
 Charlie Pierce: The Boston Globe, based in Boston
 Tony Reali: Pardon the Interruption (before hosting; Reali was originally referred to as "Stat Boy", his former nickname on PTI), contributed from the PTI set
 Dianna Russini: NFL reporter and host who contributes to ESPN's year-round coverage of the National Football League. Her multi-faceted role includes reporting, hosting, analysis and features. She contributes to NFL Live, Sunday NFL Countdown, Fantasy Football Now and SportsCenter, and she often breaks NFL news stories. Based in New York.
 Adam Schefter: Former reporter for The Denver Post and NFL Network, currently with ESPN as an NFL Insider. Schefter was still based in Denver when he appeared on Around The Horn.
 T. J. Simers: one of the original regulars along with Woody Paige, Jay Mariotti, Tim Cowlishaw, and Bob Ryan. Based at the Los Angeles Times. Left show in 2003.
 Michael Smith: Occasional co-host of Highly Questionable, former Boston Globe and ESPN.com columnist, former host of His & Hers and SportsCenter at 6, both alongside Jemele Hill. Based in Miami.
 Jon Weiner: co-host for The Dan Le Batard Show with Stugotz. Based in Miami.
 Gene Wojciechowski: ESPN.com, columnist for ESPNChicago.com. Based in Chicago, Illinois, at the site of the Sun-Times.

Panelist statistics
Statistics correct as of March 15, 2023.

Percentages rounded to the nearest tenth.

References

External links
 
 
List of Woody Paige's chalkboard quips since 2008
Around the Horn PodCenter
Article by ESPN Front Row

2002 American television series debuts
ESPN original programming
American sports television series
Sirius XM Radio programs